Sunna are a hard rock and industrial rock band from Bristol, England. They released their third album, After the Third Pin on 3 October 2011.

History 
The band toured with VAST and A Perfect Circle in 2000, as well as The Smashing Pumpkins on their final European tour. They released their debut album One Minute Science on Massive Attack's Melankolic label that year, along with the singles "O.D" and "Power Struggle". The latter single appeared in the movie Hollow Man. The third single from One Minute Science, "I'm Not Trading", was released in early 2001.

Richie Mills, their drummer, left the band in spring of 2001; he would have been replaced by Mark Richardson of Skunk Anansie, but Richardson joined Feeder instead following the death of that band's drummer Jon Lee.

Jon Harris released their second album, Two Minute Terror, in October 2009.

On 10 January 2011, Sunna announced a new album, titled After the Third Pin was in the works, and was scheduled to be released October.The album was released on 6 October 2011.

The fourth album 4 Global Mourning was released on 27 November 2013; after a phase of crowd funding.

Members 
 Current members
 Jon Harris: vocals, guitar
 Alex Clemetson: (bass guitar)
 Leon Hunt: (rhythm & lap steel guitars,, banjo)
 Josh Clark (drums, electronic percussion)
 Sid Harris (guitars)
 Jason Leverette (keyboards, samples, guitar, programming)
 Hippy Joe (mandolin)
 Clare Lindley (fiddle, keyboards)

 Past members
 Flatline (Mark Cahill): DJ (2000–2002)
 Richie Mills: drums (2000–2001)
 Mark Richardson: drums (2001–2002)
 Shane-O (Shane Goodwin): bass (2000–2001)
 Jim Harris: bass (2001–2002)
 Tim Harris: drums (1996–2000)
 Ian MacLaren: lead guitar

Discography

References

External links
 
LF Interview with Jon Harris

Astralwerks artists
British alternative metal musical groups
British industrial music groups